The Municipality of Dol pri Ljubljani is a municipality in central Slovenia. The seat of the municipality is the settlement of Dol pri Ljubljani. It is part of the traditional region of Upper Carniola and is now included in the Central Slovenia Statistical Region.

Settlements
In addition to the municipal seat of Dol pri Ljubljani, the municipality also includes the following settlements:

 Beričevo
 Brinje
 Dolsko
 Kamnica
 Kleče pri Dolu
 Klopce
 Križevska Vas
 Laze pri Dolskem
 Osredke
 Petelinje
 Podgora pri Dolskem
 Senožeti
 Videm
 Vinje
 Vrh pri Dolskem
 Zaboršt pri Dolu
 Zagorica pri Dolskem
 Zajelše

References

External links

Municipality of Dol pri Ljubljani on Geopedia
Municipal website 

Municipalities of Slovenia